My Leopold is a 1924 German silent comedy film directed by Heinrich Bolten-Baeckers and starring Arthur Kraußneck, Walter Slezak and Käthe Haack. It was the third and last of three film versions the director made of the 1873 play My Leopold.

The film's sets were designed by the art director Erich Czerwonski.

Cast
 Arthur Kraußneck as Gottlieb Weigelt
 Walter Slezak as Leopold, sein Sohn
 Käthe Haack as Klara, seine Tochter
 Georg Alexander as Komponist
 Leo Peukert as Werkführer
 Gustav Botz as Zernikow
 Paula Conrad as Amalie
 Georg John as Nibisch
 Lotte Reinicke as Minna
 Renate Rosner as Marie
 Lotte Steinhoff as Lotte
 Erna Sydow as Demoiselle Andersen

References

Bibliography
 Grange, William. Cultural Chronicle of the Weimar Republic. Scarecrow Press, 2008.

External links

1924 films
Films of the Weimar Republic
Films directed by Heinrich Bolten-Baeckers
German silent feature films
UFA GmbH films
German black-and-white films
1924 comedy films
German films based on plays
German comedy films
Silent comedy films
1920s German films
1920s German-language films